Vogt is the surname of:

Politicians and civil servants 
 Benjamin Vogt (politician) (1863–1947), Norwegian politician
 Daniel A. Vogt, Florida politician, Civil War era
 David Vogt (1793–1861), Norwegian politician 
 Franz Vogt (1899–1940), German trade unionist
 Hersleb Vogt (born 1912), Norwegian diplomat
 Hilde Vogt (born 1945), Norwegian politician
 Jan Fredrik Vogt (born 1974), Norwegian politician
Johanna Vogt (1862 – 1944), German suffragist and first female city council member in Kassel, Germany. 
 John W. Vogt (politician) (1936-2018), American politician in Florida
 Jørgen Vogt (1900–1972), Norwegian politician
 Jørgen Herman Vogt (1784–1862), Norwegian politician
 Lorenz Juhl Vogt (1828–1901), Norwegian politician
 Nils Vogt (civil servant) (1926–2000), Norwegian civil servant
 Nils Vogt (politician) (1817–1894), Norwegian politician
 Niels Nielsen Vogt (1798–1869), Norwegian politician
 Paul Benjamin Vogt (1863–1947), Norwegian politician
 Roland Vogt (born 1941), German politician
 Svend Borchmann Hersleb Vogt (1852–1923), Norwegian politician
 Ute Vogt (born 1964), German politician

Sciences 
 Carl Vogt (1817–1895), German scientist and philosopher
 Erich Vogt (born 1929), Canadian physicist
 Evon Z. Vogt (1918–2004), American anthropologist
 George B. Vogt (1920–1990), American entomologist
 Hans Vogt (1903–1986), Norwegian linguist
 Johan Herman Lie Vogt (1858–1932), Norwegian geologist
 Marthe Louise Vogt (1903–2003), German neuroscientist 
 Ramona Vogt physicist
 Richard Vogt (born 1949), American herpetologist
 Rochus Eugen Vogt (born 1929), German-American physicist
 Thorolf Vogt (1888–1958), Norwegian geologist
 William Vogt (1902-1968), American ornithologist and writer of global population issues

Medicine and psychiatry 
 Alfred Vogt (1879–1943), Swiss ophthalmologist
 Cécile Vogt-Mugnier (1875–1962), French neurologist
 Heinrich Vogt (neurologist) (1875–1936), German neurologist
 Oskar Vogt (1870–1959), German neurologist

Engineering 
 Fredrik Vogt (1892–1970), Norwegian engineer 
 Jens Theodor Paludan Vogt (1830–1892), Norwegian engineer
 Richard Vogt (aircraft designer) (1894–1979), German engineer and aircraft designer during and after World War II

Artists and writers 
 A. E. van Vogt (1912–2000), Canadian author
 Carl de Vogt (1885–1970), German actor
 David Vogt (born 1975), German musician and record producer best known as Charles Greywolf
 Hans Vogt (composer) (1911–1992), German composer and conductor
 Klaus Florian Vogt (born 1970), German tenor 
 Lars Vogt (1970–2022), German classical pianist, conductor and academic teacher
 Linda Vogt (1922–2013), Australian flautist
 Martin Vogt (born 1992), American music producer
 Nils Vogt (comedian) (born 1948), Norwegian comedian
 Nils Collett Vogt (1864–1937), Norwegian poet
 Paul C. Vogt (born 1964), American comedian
 Roy Vogt (1934-1997), Canadian economist and literary critic
 Ulrich Andreas Vogt (born 1952), German tenor and director of a concert hall

Journalists 
 Doug Vogt, Canadian photojournalist and cameraman
 Nils Vogt (journalist) (1859–1927), Norwegian newspaper editor

Other 
 Hannah Vogt (1910–1994), German historian
 Johan Herman Vogt (1900–1991), Norwegian economist
 John W. Vogt (1920-2010), American military officer
 Kevin Vogt (born 1991), German footballer
 Miriam Vogt (born 1967), German alpine skier
 Lothar Vogt (born 1952), German chess grandmaster
 Paul Vogt (pastor) (1900-1984), Swiss pastor and theologian
 Richard Vogt (boxer) (1913–1988), German boxer
 Stephen Vogt (born 1984), American baseball player
 Steven S. Vogt (born 1949), German American astronomer 
 Volrath Vogt (1817–1889), Norwegian theologist
 Von Ogden Vogt (1879-1964) American theologian and author

See also 
 Voet (surname)
 Vogt
 Vogt v. Germany
 Voigt, surname
 Funker Vogt, German electronic music project
 Voit (surname)
 Voight (surname)
 Voogd (surname)

German-language surnames
Occupational surnames
Russian Mennonite surnames